The Bertea is a left tributary of the river Aluniș in Romania. It flows into the Aluniș in the village Ostrovu.

References

Rivers of Romania
Rivers of Prahova County